Fassett may refer to:

People
Cornelia Adele Strong Fassett (1831–1898), American painter
Francis H. Fassett (1823–1908), American architect
Jacob Sloat Fassett (1853–1924), American politician and businessman
Kaffe Fassett (born 1937), American textile artist
Norman Carter Fassett (1900–1954), botanist with author abbreviation Fassett

Places
Fassett, Pennsylvania, United States
Fassett, Quebec, Canada
Fassett Square, in Dalston, London Borough of Hackney, England